Bogdanovka is a rural locality (a village) in Surensky Selsoviet, Zianchurinsky District, Bashkortostan, Russia. The population was 29 as of 2010. There is 1 street.

Geography 
Bogdanovka is located 18 km southeast of Isyangulovo (the district's administrative centre) by road. Maly Muynak is the nearest rural locality.

References 

Rural localities in Zianchurinsky District